Plume or plumes may refer to:

Science 
 Plume (feather), a prominent bird feather
 Plume (fluid dynamics), a column consisting of one fluid moving through another fluid
 Eruption plume, a column of volcanic ash and gas emitted into the atmosphere during an eruption
 Mantle plume, an upwelling of hot rock within the Earth's mantle that can cause volcanic hotspots
 Moisture plume, an alternative name for an atmospheric river, a narrow corridor of concentrated moisture in the atmosphere
 Plumage, the layer of feathers that cover a bird

Media and literature
 "Plume" (Air episode), a 2005 episode of the Japanese anime Air
 Plume, a 2006 album by Loscil
 Plumes (play), a 1927 one-act play by Georgia Douglas Johnson
 Plume (poetry collection), a 2012 book by Kathleen Flenniken
 Plume (publisher), an American book publishing company
 Plumes, a 1924 novel by Laurence Stallings
 A song by The Smashing Pumpkins on their 1994 album Pisces Iscariot
 "Plume", a song by Caravan Palace on the 2019 album Chronologic

People
 Plume Latraverse (born 1946), Canadian singer, musician, and writer
 Amélie Plume (born 1943), Swiss writer
 Helen Plume, New Zealand climate change expert
 Ilse Plume, American children's book illustrator
 Kenneth Plume (born 1977), American author and broadcaster
 Mike Plume (born  1968), Canadian country music singer and songwriter
 Roberts Plūme (1897–1956), Latvian cyclist and cross-country skier
 Thomas Plume (1630–1704), English churchman and philanthropist, founder of the Plume School

Other uses 
 Plume (company), a company that provides smart WiFi services for personal households

See also
 
 La Plume (disambiguation)
 Plumb (disambiguation)
 Plumbe (surname)
 Pluma (disambiguation)
 Plumeria
 Flume